"Arabic Kuthu" is a 2022 Indian song and the first single in the soundtrack of the Tamil-language film Beast, directed by Nelson. Starring Vijay and Pooja Hegde, the film is produced by Kalanithi Maran under the studio Sun Pictures. The track is composed by Anirudh, who also sang the track with Jonita Gandhi, while the lyrics for the track were written by actor Sivakarthikeyan. The first single to be released from the album, being highly expected from fans, was delayed multiple times.

The single released on Valentine's Day (14 February 2022). It became the most-viewed and liked South Indian song within 24 hours, garnering 25 million views within a short period, and also the fastest South Indian song to cross 50 million views. Arabic Kuthu lyrical video song has now crossed more than 500 million views and Arabic Kuthu music video crossed over 400 million views in YouTube.
The music video also peaked at no. 1 on the YouTube Global Music Video charts.

Composition 
This film marks Anirudh's third collaboration with Vijay after Kaththi (2014) and Master (2021), and with Nelson after Kolamaavu Kokila (2018) and Doctor (2021). Anirudh composed the tracks during mid-July 2021. In order to experiment with the film's music, he had composed this particular track in the Arabic music genre and had featured lyrics in Tamil and Arabic languages. The opening phrase, "Halamithi Habibo" translates to "I dreamed of my lover". Sivakarthikeyan wrote this track in mid-August 2021.

According to reports, the track is a fusion Arabic music and Kuthu (a type of Tamil folk music) as the name of the track. It also had the influence of dance and pop music. This track was sung by Anirudh and Jonita Gandhi, who previously sung for "Chellamma" in Doctor. Anirudh, in his interaction with fans during a Facebook chat session, stated that the work on the first single has been completed and will be released later, and further clarified that all the updates regarding the film will be revealed post-completion of the film's shooting.

Music video 
The music video features Vijay and Pooja Hegde dancing for the single. The music is choreographed by Jani Master. In a deleted tweet, Jani had announced that the rehearsals for the song might take place during mid-April 2021, and the song will be shot within seven days, starting from the first week of May 2021. But shooting did not take place in that date, due to Vijay's decision to halt shooting in concern with the rise in COVID-19 cases in Tamil Nadu, and also Hegde being diagnosed with COVID-19. The song was shot at Gokulam Studios during September 2021. To promote the single, Nelson shot a promotional video for the track featuring Vijay, Anirudh, Sivakarthikeyan and himself, during December 2021. The song is featured as part of a dance party which both Vijay and Pooja Hegde attended.

Marketing and release 
The single was highly anticipated by fans, and was rumoured to be released on Anirudh's birthday (16 October 2021) and later scheduled for release on Diwali (4 November 2021), which however did not happen. Makers stated that Sun Pictures' commitments to the release of Rajinikanth-starrer Annaatthe, and also the death of Puneeth Rajkumar insisted the makers not to release any update regarding the film on Diwali, which was posted on Ananda Vikatan's exclusive article about the film. The single was earlier planned to be released on New Year's Eve (31 December), and later to Pongal (14 January 2022), but could not be launched on that date.

The track was released on the occasion of Valentine's Day (14 February 2022), as Anirudh occasionally released singles on that date. The full video was released on 9 May 2022.

Reception

Audience response 
Vijay and Pooja Hegde's rolling step in the music video became a signature step and was recreated by millions, in many short-video and social media platforms. Hedge's ArabicKuthuChallenge was viral in social media, and many recreated the signature step.

Critical reviews 
The Indian Express stated Sivakarthikeyan's lyrics as the highlights which "likely to go right over the head of the listeners". The review further added "The hook line of the song is 'malama pitha pithadhe' and it's hard to tell what it means. One can't even confidently tell if it has any base in the Arabic language. And that seems to be the fun part of the song. Composer Anirudh wants to make a point that as long as the music is enjoyable, people don't sweat over incomprehensible lyrics. You see, music has no language." Asuthosh Mohan of Film Companion South called it as an "interesting fusion of Arabic and kuthu styles, repurposed to his (Anirudh's) own sensibility" and concluded that the track "works as a no-frills earworm that promises to get better with the visuals and choreography". Mohan explored the similarities of the track to that of "Mettalaa Hajbo" by Moroccan artist Karima Gouit, in terms of mood and rhythm. Khushboo Ratda of Pinkvilla reviewed: "Vijay's swag, Pooja Hegde's dance moves and Anirudh's music makes it a party anthem". A review from Medium was critical of the ordinariess tune, produced by Anirudh and wrote "This song is the epitome of what Anirudh is nowadays. He once was this admirable music director who had fresh ideas and melodies to make a catchy hook; a song that would be a treat for the senses, but then he quickly devolved into a quirky pony."

Arabic Kuthu Challenge 
Many celebrities such as Shilpa Shetty, Jacqueline Fernandez, Rakul Preet Singh, Samantha Ruth Prabhu, Keerthy Suresh, Rashmika Mandanna, Varun Dhawan, Atlee, Sivaangi Krishnakumar, Jai, Amritha Aiyer, Yashika Aannand, Vedhika and Anupama Parameswaran too recreated the music video by dancing the signature step.

Arabic Kuthu Challenge video had a cultural impact on several sportsperson including the cricketers Devon Conway, Narayan Jagadeesan, Chezhian Harinishanth, Washington Sundar, Abhishek Sharma, Priyam Garg, Jagadeesha Suchith and Subramaniam Badrinath recreated hook step. Players of Manchester United F.C. take part in the challenge and danced the step. Indian badminton player P. V. Sindhu also recreated the step.

Records 
The track garnered over 17 million views in less than 10 hours, and eventually surpassed the 24-hour records of "Oo Antava Oo Oo Antava" from Pushpa: The Rise (2021) and "Kalaavathi" from Sarkaru Vaari Paata (2022), which garnered over 14 and 16 million views within 24 hours, respectively. It registered over 25 million real-time views within 24 hours, setting an all-time record for South India's most viewed song in 24 hours, and also reached the 20-million mark within less than 24 hours. It garnered over 2.5 million likes and became the most-liked South Indian song, and the second-most liked Indian song within 24 hours, behind the title track of Dil Bechara (2020). On 18 February, the song had garnered about 50-million views and became the fastest South Indian song to achieve this feat.

According to the digital media company Genius, the track was listed as one among the top 5 songs (in the fourth position) at the global charts. The song reached 100 million views within 12 days breaking the record of "Rowdy Baby" which took 17 days to hit 100 million views.

Live performances 
On 8 April 2022, Pooja Hegde, Anirudh and Nelson performed the song at a press meet held at Hyderabad for the film's promotion.

Notes

References

External links 
 
 

2022 songs
Indian songs
Tamil film songs
Songs with music by Anirudh (composer)
Songs written for films
Viral videos
Tamil-language songs